The Village of Encinal Day School, near Encinal, New Mexico, was built in 1926.  It was listed on the National Register of Historic Places in 1980.  The listing included four contributing buildings.

The building served children of the Laguna Pueblo tribe.

It is Mission Revival in style.

It is located northwest of Encinal.

References

Schools in New Mexico
National Register of Historic Places in Valencia County, New Mexico
Mission Revival architecture in New Mexico
School buildings completed in 1926
1926 establishments in New Mexico